Ochyrocera is a genus of midget ground weavers that was first described by Eugène Louis Simon in 1892.

Species
 it contains 56 species, found mostly in the Neotropical realm in the Caribbean, South America, Guatemala, Mexico, and on the Polynesian Islands:
Ochyrocera aragogue Brescovit, Cizauskas & Mota, 2018 – Brazil
Ochyrocera arietina Simon, 1892 (type) – Cuba, St. Vincent
Ochyrocera atlachnacha Brescovit, Cizauskas & Mota, 2018 – Brazil
Ochyrocera bicolor González-Sponga, 2001 – Venezuela
Ochyrocera brumadinho Brescovit & Cizauskas, 2018 – Brazil
Ochyrocera cachote Hormiga, Álvarez-Padilla & Benjamin, 2007 – Hispaniola
Ochyrocera caeruleoamethystina Lopez & Lopez, 1997 – French Guiana
Ochyrocera callaina Dupérré, 2015 – Ecuador
Ochyrocera cashcatotoras Dupérré, 2015 – Ecuador
Ochyrocera charlotte Brescovit, Cizauskas & Mota, 2018 – Brazil
Ochyrocera chiapas Valdez-Mondragón, 2009 – Mexico
Ochyrocera coerulea (Keyserling, 1891) – Brazil
Ochyrocera coffeeicola González-Sponga, 2001 – Venezuela
Ochyrocera cornuta Mello-Leitão, 1944 – Brazil
Ochyrocera corozalensis González-Sponga, 2001 – Venezuela
Ochyrocera diablo Pérez-González, Rubio & Ramírez, 2016 – Argentina
Ochyrocera dorinha (Brescovit, Zampaulo, Pedroso & Cizauskas, 2021) – Brazil
Ochyrocera fagei Brignoli, 1974 – Mexico
Ochyrocera formosa Gertsch, 1973 – Guatemala
Ochyrocera garayae Castanheira, Pérez-González, do Prado & Baptista, 2019 – Brazil
Ochyrocera hamadryas Brignoli, 1978 – Brazil
Ochyrocera ibitipoca Baptista, González & Tourinho, 2008 – Brazil
Ochyrocera italoi Dupérré, 2015 – Ecuador
Ochyrocera itatinga Castanheira, Pérez-González, do Prado & Baptista, 2019 – Brazil
Ochyrocera janthinipes Simon, 1893 – Venezuela
Ochyrocera jarocha Valdez-Mondragón, 2017 – Mexico
Ochyrocera juquila Valdez-Mondragón, 2009 – Mexico
Ochyrocera laracna Brescovit, Cizauskas & Mota, 2018 – Brazil
Ochyrocera losrios Dupérré, 2015 – Ecuador
Ochyrocera machadoi (Gertsch, 1977) – Mexico
Ochyrocera magali (Brescovit, Zampaulo, Pedroso & Cizauskas, 2021) – Brazil
Ochyrocera minima González-Sponga, 2001 – Venezuela
Ochyrocera minotaure Dupérré, 2015 – Ecuador
Ochyrocera misspider Brescovit, Cizauskas & Mota, 2018 – Brazil
Ochyrocera monica (Brescovit, Zampaulo, Pedroso & Cizauskas, 2021) – Brazil
Ochyrocera oblita Fage, 1912 – Venezuela
Ochyrocera otonga Dupérré, 2015 – Ecuador
Ochyrocera peruana Ribera, 1978 – Peru
Ochyrocera pojoj Valdez-Mondragón, 2017 – Mexico
Ochyrocera quinquevittata Simon, 1892 – St. Vincent
Ochyrocera ransfordi (Marples, 1955) – Samoa
Ochyrocera rinocerotos Dupérré, 2015 – Ecuador
Ochyrocera ritxoco (Brescovit, Zampaulo & Cizauskas, 2021) – Brazil
Ochyrocera ritxoo (Brescovit, Zampaulo & Cizauskas, 2021) – Brazil
Ochyrocera rosinha (Brescovit, Zampaulo, Pedroso & Cizauskas, 2021) – Brazil
Ochyrocera sandovalae Baert, 2014 – Ecuador
Ochyrocera simoni O. Pickard-Cambridge, 1894 – Mexico
Ochyrocera subparamera González-Sponga, 2001 – Venezuela
Ochyrocera thibaudi Emerit & Lopez, 1985 – Lesser Antilles
Ochyrocera tinocoi Castanheira, Pérez-González, do Prado & Baptista, 2019 – Brazil
Ochyrocera ungoliant Brescovit, Cizauskas & Mota, 2018 – Brazil
Ochyrocera varys Brescovit, Cizauskas & Mota, 2018 – Brazil
Ochyrocera vesiculifera Simon, 1893 – Venezuela
Ochyrocera viridissima Brignoli, 1974 – Brazil
Ochyrocera zabaleta Dupérré, 2015 – Ecuador
Ochyrocera zamora Baert, 2014 – Ecuador

See also
 List of Ochyroceratidae species

References

Ochyroceratidae
Araneomorphae genera
Spiders of Central America
Spiders of Mexico
Spiders of South America
Spiders of the Caribbean
Taxa named by Eugène Simon